In Whyte notation, a 4-6-4-4 is a railroad steam locomotive that has four leading wheels followed by six coupled driving wheels, a second set of four driving wheels and four trailing wheels.

Other equivalent classifications are:
UIC classification: 2CB2 (also known as German classification and Italian classification)
French classification: 2322
Turkish classification: 3524
Swiss classification: 3/5+2/4 up to the early 1920s, later 5/9

The sole example of this arrangement was the PRR Q1.  This locomotive was essentially a prototype in the development of the PRR Q2, a 4-4-6-4.

References 

 
64,4-6-4-4